Marina is a female given name, the feminine of Latin Marinus, from marinus "of the sea", occurring in many European languages as well as Japanese.

Religion 
 Saint Marina (disambiguation), name of several Christian saints

Arts
 Marina (Japanese singer) (born 1987)
 Marina (Polish singer) (born 1989)
 Marina Kaye (born 1998), French singer 
 Marina Abramović (born 1946), Serbian performance artist
 Marina Berti (1924–2002), Italian film actress
 Marina de Tavira (born 1974), Mexican actress 
 Marina Diamandis (born 1985), known as "Marina" and formerly "Marina and the Diamonds", Welsh-Greek singer-songwriter
 Marina Giordana (born 1955), Italian actress
 Marina Golbahari (born 1989), Tajik-Afghan actress
 Marina Inoue (born 1985), Japanese singer and voice actress
 Marina Karella (born 1940), Greek artist
 Marina Keegan (1989-2012), American author and playwright
 Marina Khan (born 1962), Pakistani TV actress
 Marina Kuroki (born 1988), Japanese actress and gravure idol
 Marina Lewycka (born 1946), British-Ukrainian novelist
 Marina Lima (born 1955), Brazilian singer and songwriter
 Marina Ōno, (born 1972), Japanese voice actress
 Marina Orsini (born 1967), Canadian actress
 Marina Piccinini (born 1968), Italian American flautist
 Marina Pierro (born 1960), Italian actress
 Marina Poplavskaya (born 1977), Russian opera singer
 Marina Prior (born 1963), Australian singer and actress
 Marina Ripa Di Meana (1941–2018), Italian writer, actress, director, stylist and TV personality
 Marina Ruy Barbosa (born 1995), Brazilian actress
 Marina Salandy-Brown, Trinidadian broadcaster, journalist and cultural activist
 Marina Semyonova (1908-2010), Soviet ballerina 
 Marina Sirtis (born 1955), British-American actress
 Marina Suma (born 1959), Italian actress
 Marina Tsintikidou (born 1971), Greek fashion model and TV presenter
 Marina Tsvetaeva (1892–1941), Russian poet and writer, frequently referred to by her first name
 Marina Tucaković (1953–2021), Serbian lyricist
 Marina Vlady (born 1938), French actress
 Marina Warner (born 1946), English writer, historian and mythographer
 Marina Watanabe (born 1970), Japanese singer and actress

Politics and journalism
 Princess Marina, Duchess of Kent (1906–1968), member of the British Royal family, formerly a Greek princess
 Marina Ferrari (born 1973), French politician
 Marina Hyde (born 1974), British journalist
 Marina Kaljurand (born 1962), Estonian diplomat
 Marina Mahathir, Malaysian journalist, daughter of Mahathir bin Mohamad
 Marina Mniszech (1588–1614), Polish political adventurer
 Marina Mukabenova (born 1982), Russian politician
 Marina Orgeyeva (born 1959), Russian politician
 Marina Ovsyannikova (born 1978), Russian journalist and TV producer
 Marina Silva (born 1958), Brazilian politician and environmentalist
 Marina Weisband (born 1987), German politician
 Marina van Zyl, South African politician
 Marina Yannakoudakis (born 1956), British politician

Sports
 Marina Akulova (born 1985), Russian volleyball player
 Marina Canetti (born 1983), Brazilian water polo player
 Marina Dmitrović (born 1985), Serbian handball player
 Marina Erakovic (born 1988), New Zealand tennis player
 Marina Granovskaia (born 1975), Russian-Canadian director of Chelsea Football Club
 Marina Karaflou (born 1980), Greek shooter
 Marina Khan (bowls) (born 1965), New Zealand bowls player
 Marina Kiehl (born 1965), German skier and Olympic gold medalist
 Marina Klimova  (born 1966), Russian figure skater
 Marina Kuptsova (born 1981), Russian high jumper
 Marina Maljković (born 1981), Serbian basketball coach
 Marina Malpica (born 2000), Mexican rhythmic gymnast 
 Marina Radu (born 1984), Canadian water polo player
 Marina Rajčić (born 1993), Montenegrin handball player
 Marina Sheshenina (born 1985), Russian volleyball player
 Marina Tumas (born 1981), Belarusian volleyball player
 Marina Vasarmidou (born 1972), Greek sprinter

Others
 Marina, better known as 'La Malinche,' was the Nahua interpreter, advisor, and paramour of Hernán Cortés (d. 1529)
 Marina Galina, Venetian dogaressa (d. 1420)
 Marina Nani, Venetian dogaressa (d.1473)
 Marina Orlova (born 1980), Russian internet celebrity with the show on YouTube, HotForWords
 Marina Papaelia, Greek-Egyptian Miss World contestant
 Marina Oswald Porter (born 1941), former widow of Lee Harvey Oswald, the presumed assassin of U.S. President John F. Kennedy
 Marina Raskova (1912-1943), Russian Navigator
 Marina Shiraishi (born 1986), Japanese singer

Fictional characters 
 Marina, the daughter of the leading character Prince Pericles of Tyre in the play Pericles, Prince of Tyre (1608) by William Shakespeare and (probably) George Wilkins
 Marina, title character in George Lillo's play Marina (1738), based on the preceding
 Marina (aka "Number Seven"), one of the main protagonists in the Lorien Legacies series by Pittacus Lore
 Marina, an octopus villager from the video game series Animal Crossing
 Marina Liteyears, the main protagonist of Treasure's Mischief Makers video game
 Marina, the young mermaid in the TV series Stingray
 Marina, title character in telenovela Marina
 Marina Ismail, a Middle-Eastern princess from the anime Mobile Suit Gundam 00
 Marina (Peggle), one of the Peggle Masters that was first seen in Peggle Nights
 Marina, a main character in the Nickelodeon TV series The Fresh Beat Band and its spin-off Fresh Beat Band of Spies
 Princess Marina, the seventh and youngest mermaid in the 1975 animated film Hans Christian Andersen's The Little Mermaid
 Marina Ferrer, a minor character in The L Word. Jenny Schechter's first lesbian relationship in the show takes place with this character
 Marina Green, a Fishtronaut character
 Marina Cooper Lewis, a character on the television soap opera Guiding Light
 Marina, one of the members of the fictional band Off The Hook from the video game Splatoon 2, the other being Pearl
 Marina Romanova, a main character appearing in season 3 and season 6 of a detective-themed video game Criminal Case.
 Marina Tsukishima, a staff member at CiRCLE in the anime BanG Dream! and in the game BanG Dream! Girls Band Party!
 Marina (aka "Water Pirate"), a mermaid pirate in the Disney Junior animated series Jake and the Never Land Pirates
 Marina, the water-talent fairy in the shutdown online game Pixie Hollow and the TV special Pixie Hollow Games
 Marina, an NPC (Non-Player Character) in Hypixel's MMORPG gamemode, Skyblock
 Marina, an anthropomorphic penguin who is a love interest to Hubie in the 1995 animated film The Pebble and the Penguin
 Marina, one of the Mermaids of Whitecap Bay in the 2011 film Pirates of the Caribbean: On Stranger Tides

Feminine given names
Latin feminine given names
Romanian feminine given names
Slavic feminine given names
Italian feminine given names
Russian feminine given names
Ukrainian feminine given names
English feminine given names
Portuguese feminine given names
Spanish feminine given names
Pakistani feminine given names
Polish feminine given names
Belarusian feminine given names
Serbian feminine given names
Japanese feminine given names
Greek feminine given names
Sammarinese given names